Flamingo Road is an American prime time television soap opera that aired on NBC. It premiered as a television film on May 12, 1980, and as a series on January 6, 1981, after a rebroadcast of the pilot on December 30, 1980. The show was based on a 1942 Robert Wilder novel of the same name and the 1949 movie scripted by Wilder and starring Joan Crawford. 

The show was created by Lorimar Productions, who was producing CBS's Dallas and Knots Landing at the same time. Set in the present-day fictional town of Truro, Florida, Flamingo Road centered on the wealthy Weldon family, who made their fortune running the town paper mill.

Television film (1980)
The show's pilot introduces the Weldon family who reside on the ritzy Flamingo Road in Truro, Florida. Claude Weldon (Kevin McCarthy) is the patriarch, who owns the town's paper mill, who is turning the family business over to his son, Skipper (Woody Brown). Eudora (Barbara Rush) is his neglected wife, Constance Weldon (Morgan Fairchild) is his spoiled adopted daughter. Constance is engaged to Deputy Fielding "Field" Carlyle, whose every move is dominated by the corrupt Sheriff Titus Semple (Howard Duff), who virtually controls the small town. 

Field develops a relationship with Lane Ballou (Cristina Raines), a singer with Coyne's Traveling Circus, who is left behind when the circus is run out of town. Titus is dismayed by this, as he wants Field to someday become a Senator and marry into the Weldon family. After Lane takes a job at the Eagle Cafe, alongside Annabelle Troy (Dianne Kay), Skipper's girlfriend, Titus plots her demise, and at the end of the first hour, Lane is falsely picked up for solicitation. After completing her sentence, Lane defiantly returns to town, taking a job with Lute-Mae Sanders (Stella Stevens), the local bordello owner and Constance's secret mother with Claude, and forming a connection with Sam Curtis (John Beck), a construction magnate. Field and Constance eventually get married with much of the town in attendance, and Eudora finds comfort in Elmo Tyson (Mason Adams), publisher of the town's newspaper. Claude reveals his financial issues to Titus, who agrees to help him in an insurance fraud scheme. The mill is set aflame, with Annabelle (who is revealed to be Titus' daughter and planning on meeting Skipper there) accidentally perishing in the fire.

Weekly series (1981–1982)

Synopsis
The series picks up where the pilot left off, with Sheriff Titus double-crossing a drug dealing couple, who take revenge by abducting newlyweds Field and Constance, who are honeymooning in the Bahamas. They are eventually saved by Sam Curtis, however the drama continues when they return to Truro. Field, who is campaigning for senator, invites Lane to a trip to Tallahassee, where they continue their affair. Constance gets wind of Field's deception and begins conspiring with Titus to get Lane sent out of town. Meanwhile, Annabelle's mother, Mary Troy (Alice Hirson), comes to town to investigate her daughter's violent death, and the possibility that the Weldon fire was arson. It is revealed that Annabelle was the product of rape, when Sheriff Titus forced himself on Mary.

As the election nears, Field falls off the wagon and turns up drunk at an important political rally. To save his campaign, Constance blabs unconfirmed information about his opponent, and in the end, Field wins the election and is made a Senator of Florida. Their marriage eventually falls apart. Skipper prepares to leave town to accept a job in New Orleans, but decides to stay after Claude is seriously injured in an accident at the mill. He then starts dating Christie Kovacs (Denise Galik), a manipulative girl living with her overbearing sister Alice (Marcia Rodd), a mill employee who is secretly in love with Claude. Christie has an affair with Field, and the two end up in a car accident together, which threatens to ruin Field's political career. Both sisters eventually leave town.

Meanwhile, Lane is tormented by an old acquaintance, for having information about a murder that occurred several years earlier. After an old friend from the circus, Beth McDonald (Sandra Kerns), turns up dead, Lane is kidnapped by the killer Slade (Michael Baseleon). Constance agrees to a divorce with Field, and has a tryst with Sam in revenge. The first season ends with the most of the cast trapped in a hurricane and taking refuge at Lute-Mae's, where Lane's kidnappers are arrested. After Field comforts Lane, Constance confronts him, claiming the divorce papers she had drawn were fakes and that she and Field were still married. In a rage, Field and Constance get into an altercation, with Constance falling from the second-story staircase at Lute-Mae's place.

In season two, Constance survives her fall, but is paralyzed indefinitely from the waist down as a result. This becomes a political scandal for Field, but Constance agrees to not to press charges if he continues their sham of a marriage. Eudora discovers that Lute-Mae and Claude are Constance's biological parents. Lute-Mae faces her own problems when she is raped by a delivery boy, who is the son of an influential Truro family. Titus refuses to conduct a proper investigation, however Lute-Mae works with Late to get justice. 

Field campaigns aggressively to fix a Cuban barrio in town, before discovering Claude is the owner (under Eudora's name). Ruthless tycoon Michael Tyrone (David Selby) comes to town, and gets into a bidding war with Sam for a piece of waterfront property, and with Claude and Eudora for the barrio. Eudora refuses to sell, and develops an addiction to painkillers. Constance eventually regains the use of her legs, but pretends to be paralyzed to keep Field around. The truth eventually comes out when Eudora's addiction worsens, and Eudora is sent to live in a mental sanitarium until she recovers. While she is away, Claude forges her signature to sign the barrio over to Tyrone, who plans on building a casino resort on the property and has Titus evict the Cubans who live there. They include Julio Sanchez (Fernando Allende), who becomes Constance's lover, and his sister Alicia (Gina Gallego), who falls in love with Skipper. When Eudora gets wind of her name being forged, Tyrone loses the barrio, in revenge, he buys the local blank and forecloses on Claude's paper mill, making Field the new owner. Sam and Lane fall in love and get married. Elmo's feud with Titus heats up, with Titus setting off an explosion at the newspaper which leaves Skipper sightless. Alicia stays by him, and they eventually elope and move into the Weldon mansion together.  

Field starts dating a reporter, Sandy Swanson (Cynthia Sikes), who is secretly Michael Tyrone's sister. Tyrone's true intentions are revealed, he has come to Truro in revenge after Field's father, Judge Andrew Carlyle, convicted his father for murder and gave him the death penalty. Tyronne firmly believed that his father was innocent, despite the endless evidence that pointed to his guilt, and wanted everyone connected to Judge Carlyle and Titus, who was still sheriff at the time, to suffer. He uses voodoo as his method of destruction, crashing Sam and Field's plane in the Everglades, and then killing his own sister for sleeping with Field by having her car go off a cliff.

After sleeping with nearly everyone else on the cast, Tyrone and Constance start an affair. He then leaves her for Lute-Mae, after finding out she's Constance's mother. Lane and Sam announce that they are expecting a baby. After his season-long campaign to make gambling legal in Florida fails, Tyrone reveals to Constance her true parentage. Soon after, he is shot and presumably killed. In the series finale, several cast members are suspected of the crime before Lute-Mae is arrested as the prime suspect. However, the show ends on a cliffhanger, with Tyrone showing up alive at a reclusive mountaintop monastery.

Reception
Though the show was initially popular, it soon succumbed to being scheduled against ABC's mystery romance Hart to Hart. NBC pulled the plug on the show in Spring 1982 with its cliffhanger left unresolved, though reruns aired in the timeslot until mid summer of that year. As the 1981–82 season ranked No. 68 out of 105 shows, NBC executives planned a half-hour daytime version of the series to debut in September 1982, but this never came to pass  despite the fact a bible for a third season had been drafted by producer Jeff Freilich.

Several of its stars later became better known for other soap opera appearances, with Morgan Fairchild starring on the short-lived soap Paper Dolls before reuniting with David Selby on Falcon Crest and later appearing on ABC's The City. John Beck went onto appear on Dallas, while Howard Duff had recurring roles on both Dallas and Knots Landing. The character of Constance Weldon ranked at #16 on E!'s list of The 50 Most Wicked Women in Primetime.

Cast and characters

Main characters
Sam Curtis (John Beck, 1980–1982; 38 episodes)
A wealthy playboy construction magnate and owner of Sam Curtis Construction. During the course of the series, he becomes Field's campaign manager, has a brief romance with Constance, before settling down and becoming a devoted husband to Lane. He is loosely based on Dan Reynolds as played by David Brian in the 1949 film.
Skipper Weldon (Woody Brown,  1980–1982; 38 episodes)
The handsome son of Claude and Eudora Weldon. He initially works for his father's business before joining the town newspaper. During the series, he becomes romantically involved with Annabelle Troy (Dianne Kay), before she perishes in the fire at the mill, Christie Kovacs and Alicia Sanchez. He is blinded in a explosion at the paper, orchestrated by Sheriff Titus, and eventually elopes with Alicia.
Sheriff Titus Semple (Howard Duff, 1980–1982; 38 episodes)
The corrupt sheriff of Truro County. During the series, he is responsible for numerous dirty deeds, such as setting Lane Ballou up as a prostitute and getting her arrested, orchestrating the Weldon Mill fire for insurance fraud, getting Field and Constance abducted by drug dealers, and causing an explosion at the newpaper. He is also revealed to be the father of Annabelle Troy, having raped her mother Mary (Alice Hirson). Titus is based on the character played by Sydney Greenstreet in the 1949 film and was originally pitched as the long-lost father of Lane, however this plotline was dropped before the series made it to air. 
Constance Weldon Semple Carlyle (Morgan Fairchild, 1980–1982; 38 episodes)
The spoiled adopted daughter of Claude and Eudora Weldon. She marries her high school sweetheart Fielding Carlyle in the pilot, however during the course of series, has sex with nearly every other male character. She is loosely based on Annabelle Weldon as played by Virginia Huston in the 1949 film.
Fielding "Field" Carlyle (Mark Harmon, 1980–1982; 38 episodes)
The town deputy in the pilot, who embarks on a political career and eventually becomes a state senator. He marries Constance, however they later divorce, and during the series, he becomes romantically involved with Lane and Sandy Swanson. Field is based on Fielding Carlisle as played by Zachary Scott in the 1949 film.
Claude Weldon (Kevin McCarthy, 1980–1982; 38 episodes)
The patriarch of the Weldon family and owner of the Weldon Mill. He is a close ally of Titus, who helps him commit insurance fraud to bail out his financial troubles. He secretly fathered Constance with Lute-Mae.
Lane Ballou Curtis (Cristina Raines, 1980–1982; 38 episodes)
A traveling singer who escapes the circus and ends up working at Lute-Mae's bordello. She initially becomes Field's mistress, before settling down and marrying Sam. An older version of the character was played by Joan Crawford in the 1949 film.
Eudora Flowers Weldon (Barbara Rush, 1980–1982; 38 episodes)
Claude's long-suffering wife, who married him out of convenience. She secretly has feelings for Elmo, her childhood love. During the series, she becomes addicted to painkillers and spends time in a mental institution. In the finale, she asks Claude for a divorce.
Lute-Mae Sanders (Stella Stevens, 1980–1982; 38 episodes)
A former madam and owner of the local bordello. She becomes a mother figure for Lane, and is eventually revealed to be Constance's biological mother, after having an affair with Claude. She is based on the character played by Gladys George in the 1949 film.
Elmo Tyson (Mason Adams, 1980; 1 episode; Peter Donat, 1981–1982; 37 episodes)
The editor of the town's newspaper The Clarion. He is secret admirer of Eudora, and later feuds with Titus when he runs for Sheriff. Elmo (originally named Elmo Weldon) was pitched as Claude Weldon's first cousin, however this aspect was scrapped in pre-production.

Recurring characters
Jasper (Glenn Robards, 1981–1982; 38 episodes)
The trusted butler at the Welden family mansion.
Deputy Tyler (John Shearin, 1981; 7 episodes)
The town deputy who replaces Field as Titus' right-hand man when he runs for Senator.
Phil (Charlie Robinson, 1981; 7 episodes)
The bartender at Lute-Mae's bordello.
Slade (Michael Baseleon, 1981; 6 episodes)
A mysterious man from Lane's past, who is stalking her and murdering her friends from the circus. He is arrested in the finale of the first season.
Christie Kovacs (Denise Galik, 1981; 5 episodes)
Skipper's devious girlfriend with a sordid past, who ends up in bed with Fielding and leaves town after surviving a car accident with him.
Alice Kovacs (Marcia Rodd, 1981; 4 episodes)
Christie's stern older sister who is secretly in love with Claude Weldon. She leaves town not long after her sister does.
Tony (Joel Bailey, 1981–1982; 9 episodes)
Christie's boyfriend, who later is romantically involved with Lute-Mae, becoming the bar's handyman. He ends up stealing from her to cover his gambling losses, and they break up when he tries to blackmail her.
Julio Sanchez (Fernando Allende, 1981–1982; 15 episodes)
The fiery son of Luis (Julio Medina) and Lupe Sanchez (Carmen Zapata), who work for Sam and live in the barrio. He becomes one of Constance's many lovers, which ends when he steals her jewellery. 
Alicia Sanchez Weldon (Gina Gallego, 1981–1982; 13 episodes)
Julio's younger sister. She eventually falls in love with and marries Skipper, much to the disapproval of his family.
Michael Tyrone (David Selby, 1981–1982; 18 episodes)
A cunning and debonair businessman who is out for revenge on the town. He later employs Julia (Esther Rolle), a voodoo high priestess to curse the townspeople, eventually killing his own sister.
Sandy Tyrone Swanson (Cynthia Sikes, 1981–1982; 9 episodes)
A reporter who falls for Field. It is eventually revealed that she is Michael's sister, who is involved his revenge plot against Field and Titus. She is killed after driving off a cliff.

Episodes

Series overview

Television film (1980)

Season 1 (1980–81)

Season 2 (1981–82)

International broadcasts
The show aired in the United Kingdom from 1981 to 1983 on BBC1. It also was rerun in the United States on the Goodlife TV Network from June 2003 to September 2004.

In France, the show was shown on the channel La Cinq, then owned by former Italian Prime Minister Silvio Berlusconi.

The show was aired in Turkey on the state-owned network TRT from 1981-1982. Its popularity ended up with many establishments, particularly patisseries, to be named "Flamingo Yolu" (Turkish literal translation) after the series, and even some municipalities throughout Turkey named parks and promenades as that.

References

External links
 
 

1980 American television series debuts
1982 American television series endings
NBC original programming
American television soap operas
American primetime television soap operas
Live action television shows based on films
Television series by Lorimar Television
Television shows set in Florida
English-language television shows